This is a list of restaurateurs. A restaurateur is a person who opens and runs restaurants professionally. Although over time the term has come to describe any person who owns a restaurant, traditionally it refers to a highly skilled professional who is proficient in all aspects of the restaurant business.

Restaurateurs

  Gastón Acurio
  Pius Alibek Hermez
  Alex Atala
  Askar Baitassov
  Eddie Blay
  Marcel Boulestin
  Norman E. Brinker
  Ion Luca Caragiale
  Engracia Cruz-Reyes
  Teun van Dijck
  Gato Dumas
  Robert Earl
  Guy Fieri
  Will Guidara
  Károly Gundel
  Juan José Gutiérrez
  Ching Hai
  Leopold Hawelka
  Jean-Pierre Koepp
  Jimmy Lahoud
  Brian McKenna
  Georges Mora
  Ken Oringer
  Ioan Gyuri Pascu
  Jacky Robert
  Sakis Rouvas
  Wilhelmina Skogh
  Eduardo Sousa
  Stephen Starr
  Jean-Philippe Susilovic
  Chin-hui Tsao
  Oscar Tschirky
  Mór Ungerleider
  Virgilio Martínez Véliz
  Cajsa Wahllund

By nationality

Australia

  George Calombaris
  Andrew Cibej
  Pete Evans
  Manu Feildel
  Shanaka Fernando
  Michelle Garnaut
  Guy Grossi
  Peter Kuruvita
  Karen Martini
  Gary Mehigan
  Matt Moran
  Mietta O'Donnell
  Rocco Pantaleo
  Tetsuya Wakuda
  Samuel Wynn
  Yip Ho Nung
  Gum Yuen

Austria
 Arnold Schwarzenegger

Bahrain
 Tala Bashmi

Brazil
 Robert Falkenburg

Canada

  Hugh Acheson
  Shereen Arazm
  Sean Avery
  Nat Bailey
  Joe Beef
  Massimo Capra
  Maggie Cassella
  Christy Chung
  Lynn Crawford
  Meeru Dhalwala
  Danica d'Hondt
  Stefano Faita
  Rob Feenie
  Ryan Gosling
  Wayne Gretzky
  Ryan Holmes
  Hector Jimenez-Bravo
  Harry Kambolis
  Jamie Kennedy
  Susur Lee
  Brad Long
  Mark McEwan
  Robert J. Patterson
  Duke Redbird
  Tim Rozon
  Joey Ghazal
  Guy Rubino
  Michael Smith
  Marc Thuet
  Vikram Vij
  Stephen Yan
  Zal Yanovsky
  Maurice Zbriger

Denmark

  Silla Bjerrum
  Jan Friis-Mikkelsen
  Sven and Lene Grønlykke
  Rasmus Kofoed
  Claus Meyer
  Adam Price
  René Redzepi
  Lertchai Treetawatchaiwong

El Salvador 

 Graciela de Holman

France

  Antoine Beauvilliers 
  Louis Bignon 
  Georges Blanc 
  Raymond Blanc 
  Paul Bocuse 
  Joël Dupuch
  Stéphane Froidevaux 
  Jean Galatoire 
  Jacques Genin 
  Michel Guérard 
  Jean Joho 
  Ludo Lefebvre 
  Édouard Loubet 
  Sébastien Masi 
  Michel Michaud 
  Jean-Christophe Novelli 
  Claude Philippe 
  Thierry Rautureau 
  Stéphane Reynaud 
  Kilien Stengel 
  Jean Sulpice 
  Pierre Troisgros 
  Roger Vergé

Germany

 Lorenz Adlon
 Eitel Brothers
 Vincent Klink
 Silvio Kuhnert
 Paul Merker
 Kadir Nurman

Hong Kong
Vicky Lau

India

  Riyaaz Amlani
  Ritu Dalmia
  Ketan Kadam
  Prahlad Kakkar
  J.K. Kapur
  Farrokh Khambata
  Kumar Mahadevan
  Manish Makhija
  P. Rajagopal
  Vivek Singh
  Cyrus Todiwala
  Nelson Wang

Italy

 Emilio Baglioni
 Massimo Bottura
 Salvatore Cuomo
 Toni Dalli
 Pino Luongo
 Sirio Maccioni
 Modesto Marini
 Lucia Pavin

Massimo Dobrovic

Japan

 Hiroaki Aoki
 Toshiro Kandagawa
 Yoshihiro Narisawa
 Nui Onoue

Lithuania

 Linas Tadas Karosas
 Tadas Karosas

Mexico

 Cesar Balsa
 Caesar Cardini
 Eduardo Santamarina

New Zealand

 Des Britten
 Vernon Lawrence Clare
 Stanley Nicholas Garland
 Jack Macdonald

Nigeria

 Bolanle Austen-Peters
 Muma Gee
 Kehinde Kamson
 Nike Oshinowo

Norway

 Ole Jonny Eikefjord
 Julius Fritzner
 Eyvind Hellstrøm
 Kari Innerå
 Einar Rose
 Christen Sveaas

Pakistan

 Zubaida Tariq

Russia

 Anatoly Komm

Spain

 Cesar Balsa

Sweden

 Gustafva Björklund 
 Niklas Ekstedt
 Carl Jan Granqvist
 Marcus Samuelsson

Thailand

 Gaggan

Turkey

 Hüseyin Özer
 Nusret Gökçe

United Kingdom

  Muquim Ahmed 
  Enam Ali 
  Kaniz Ali 
  Siraj Ali 
  Jamie Barber 
  Aldo Berni 
  Frank Berni 
  Mark Birley 
  Peter Boizot 
  Vito Cataffo 
  Foysol Choudhury 
  Peter Evans 
  John Maria Gatti 
  Rose Gray 
  Nick Jones 
  Omar Khan 
  Joel Kissin 
  Atul Kochhar 
  Abdul Latif 
  Alvin Leung 
  Magnus Lindgren 
  Simon Loftus 
  Tommy Miah 
  David Moore 
  Timothy Moxon 
  Alan Murchison 
  Jean-Christophe Novelli 
  Hüseyin Özer 
  Claude Philippe 
  Gordon Ramsay 
  Bajloor Rashid 
  Mandy Rice-Davies 
  Egon Ronay 
  Mohammed Sabir 
  Siegi Sessler 
  Lisa Vanderpump 
  Iqbal Wahhab 
  Marco Pierre White 
  Sarah Willingham 
  Simon Wright 
  Alan Yau

England

  Jill Adams
  Amjad Bashir
  Walter Baxter
  Aiden Byrne
  Lee Chapman
  Atique Choudhury
  Terence Conran
  Robert Earl
  Keith Floyd
  Jeff Galvin
  Damien Hirst
  Aktar Islam
  Disley Jones
  Keith McNally
  Mary-Ellen McTague
  Thomasina Miers
  Jamie Oliver
  Sid Owen
  James Pimm
  Vaughan Smith

Scotland

 Bashir Ahmad
 Mac Henderson

United States

By type

Restaurant founders

 Robert Earl
 Adam Fleischman
 Gordon Hamersley
 Prue Leith
 Juanita Musson
 David M. Overton
 Bob Payton
 Melissa Perello
 P. Rajagopal
 Daniel R. Scoggin
 Lydia Shire
 Jasper White

Fast casual chain founders

 Gus Boulis
 Leeann Chin
 Arthur Cores
 Steve Ells

Fast-food chain founders

  Dave Barham 
  Burt Baskin 
  Glen Bell 
  Samuel Truett Cathy 
  Derek Cha 
  Blake Chanslor 
  Andrew Cherng 
  George W. Church, Sr. 
  Al Copeland 
  Lucia Cunanan 
  Fred DeLuca 
  David Edgerton 
  Tom Forkner 
  Jack Fulk 
  Todd Graves 
  Murray Handwerker 
  Nathan Handwerker 
  Wilber Hardee 
  Pete Harman 
  Tim Horton 
  Howard Deering Johnson 
  Ron Joyce 
  Carl Karcher 
  Margaret Karcher 
  Daniel J. Kim 
  Ray Kroc 
  Young Lee 
  Gust E. Lundberg 
  Pat McDonagh 
  Richard and Maurice McDonald 
  James McLamore 
  Hugh Morris 
  Albert Okura 
  Robert O. Peterson 
  Harold Pierce 
  Irv Robbins 
  Joe Rogers, Sr. 
  William Rosenberg 
  Vernon Rudolph 
  Nabi Saleh 
  Colonel Sanders 
  Ike Sewell 
  Troy Smith 
  Esther Snyder 
  Harry Snyder 
  Felix Stehling 
  Brody Sweeney 
  Tony Tan 
  Dave Thomas 
  Lovie Yancey

Pizza chain founders

 Nolan Bushnell 
 Dan and Frank Carney 
 Aaron Fechter 
 Carol Grimaldi 
 Marian Ilitch 
 Mike Ilitch 
 Sherwood Johnson 
 Gennaro Lombardi 
 Tom Monaghan 
 John Schnatter 
 Ken Selby 
 William Theisen

See also
 List of Michelin starred restaurants

Restaurateurs
Restaurateurs